In mathematics, the Schur class consists of the Schur functions: the holomorphic functions from the open unit disk to the closed unit disk.

The Schur parameters γj of a Schur function f0  are defined recursively by

The Schur parameters γj all have absolute value at most 1.

This gives a continued fraction expansion of the Schur function f0 by repeatedly using the fact that

which gives

See also 
 Szegő polynomial

References

Complex analysis